Anni-Maija Fincke (21 january 1984) is a Finnish orienteering competitor.

She participated at the 2009 World Orienteering Championships in Miskolc, where she placed 6th in the sprint and 7th in the middle distance. She won a silver medal in the relay with the Finnish team at the 2010 European Orienteering Championships in Primorsko.

References

External links
 
 

Year of birth missing (living people)
Living people
Finnish orienteers
Female orienteers
Foot orienteers
World Orienteering Championships medalists
Junior World Orienteering Championships medalists